The Lumbini pillar inscription, also called the Paderia inscription, is an inscription in the ancient Brahmi script, discovered in December 1896 on a pillar of Ashoka in Lumbini, Nepal by former Chief of the Nepalese Army General Khadga Shamsher Jang Bahadur Rana under the authority of Nepalese government and assisted by Alois Anton Führer. Another famous inscription discovered nearby in a similar context is the Nigali-Sagar inscription. The Lumbini inscription is generally categorized among the Minor Pillar Edicts of Ashoka, although it is in the past tense and in the ordinary third person (not the royal third person), suggesting that it is not a pronouncement of Ashoka himself, but a rather later commemoration of his visit in the area.

Discovery of the pillar
Ancient historical records of the Buddhist monuments of the region, made by the ancient Chinese monk-pilgrim Faxian in the early 5th century CE and by another ancient Chinese monk-pilgrim Xuanzang in the 7th century CE, had been used in an effort to search for the place of birth of Gautama Buddha, said to be in Lumbini, and his ancient city of Kapilavastu. The Lumbini pillar itself, set up where the Buddha was born, was mentioned by Xuanzang, who said that it was surmounted by the sculpture of a horse and that it had been broken in half, but he never mentioned the presence of an inscription, which, according to Vincent A. Smith, may already have been hidden by the time he visited in the 7th century. The description by Xuanzang adds that the pillar was split in two and fallen on the ground at the time he saw it.

The pillar was supported underground by a brick base, which according to Vincent A. Smith had to be of a comparatively more recent date. He suggested that the fallen pillar had been re-erected at the time of the Buddhist Pala dynasty, in the 11th or 12th century.

The existence of the stone pillar itself was already known before the discovery: it had already been reported to Vincent A. Smith by a local landowner named Duncan Ricketts, around twelve years before (circa 1884). Rubbings of the Medieval inscriptions on top of the pillar had been sent by Ricketts, but they were thought of no great consequence. Führer has also heard about the pillar in 1895, while he was investigating the nearby Nigali-Sagar pillar.

Discovery of the inscription (1896)
In December 1896, Alois Anton Führer was making a follow-up survey of the nearby Nigali-Sagar pillar, discovered and investigated by him the previous year, in March 1895.

According to some accounts, Führer found the Lumbini pillar on December 1, and then asked the help of local commander, General Khadga Shumsher Rana, to excavate it. According to other accounts General Khadga Samsher Rana knew the location of the pillar and led Führer to it. Reportedly, Führer was not present when the inscription was discovered, as he arrived only "a little later", but Ricketts was witness to it. Initially, only the top of the pillar was visible, with a Medieval inscription on it. The Nepalese authorities dug around the pillar, to find the ancient Brahmi inscription, which therefore had remained underground, hidden from view. 
 
The Brahmi inscription on the pillar gives evidence that Ashoka, emperor of the Maurya Empire, visited the place in 3rd-century BCE and identified it as the birth-place of the Buddha. The inscription was translated by Paranavitana:

Aftermath

Following the discovery of the pillar, Führer relied on the accounts of ancient Chinese pilgrims to search for Kapilavastu, which he thought had to be in Tilaurakot. Unable to find anything significant, he started excavating some structures at Sagarwa, which he said were stupas of the Shakyas, and was in the process of faking pre-Mauryan inscriptions on bricks, when he was caught in the act by Vincent Arthur Smith.

Soon after, Alois Anton Führer was exposed as "a forger and dealer in fake antiquities", and had to resign from his position in 1898. Führer's early archaeological successes had apparently encouraged him to inflate his later discoveries to the point of creating forgeries. Vincent Arthur Smith further revealed in 1901 the blunt truth about Führer's Nepalese discoveries, saying of Führer's description of the archaeological remains at Nigali Sagar that "every word of it is false", and characterizing several of Führer's epigraphic discoveries in the area, including the inscriptions at the alleged Shakya stupas at Sagarwa, as "impudent forgeries". However Smith never challenged the authenticity of the Lumbini pillar inscription and the Nigali Sagar inscription.

Führer had written in 1897 a monograph on his discoveries in Nigali Sagar and Lumbini, Monograph on Buddha Sakyamuni's birth-place in the Nepalese tarai which was withdrawn from circulation.

Forged Brahmi inscriptions by Führer
In 1912, the German Indologist Heinrich Lüders identified in the Lucknow Provincial Museum (of which  Führer had been curator) several forged inscriptions in Brahmi on artifacts belonging to Führer's 1889–1891 excavations at Mathura and the Ramnagar site of Ahichchhatra, forgeries which he attributed to Führer himself. Some of the forged inscriptions were direct copies of inscriptions on other objects, previously published in Epigraphia Indica. In particular Lüders was able to show that supposed Jain inscriptions were fakes compiled from earlier real inscriptions found in Mathura. Of the Mathura inscriptions discovered by Führer, Lüders summarized in 1912 that "As all statements about epigraphical finds that admit of verification have proved to be false, it is very likely that no inscriptions at all have turned up".

Issues of authenticity
Although generally accepted as genuine, this inscription does raise a few issues in terms of authenticity:
 The Lumbini inscription is in the third person, written by someone reporting a past visit of Devanampriya Priyadarsi, and is not written in Devanampriya Priyadarsi's own name contrary to all other known Edicts of Ashoka. So, by its own internal evidence, it may have been written at any time in history after the ruler's visit. In effect, ancient Brahmi was still understood until the beginning of 4th century CE before being rediscovered in the 19th century.
 The qualifier used for the Buddha in the inscription is Sakyamuni, which is a partly Sanskritized form of the Prakrit Sakamuni ( "Sage of the Sakas), although the fully Sanskritized form would be Śakyamuni (pronounced "Shakyamuni"). The problem is that the rest of the inscription is entirely in Prakrit, and Sanskrit inscriptions are not otherwise attested before the 1st century BCE-1st century CE. "Sakyamuni" only appears in the Lumbini inscription, the other known forms being "Sakiya" in the Piprahwa inscription, "Sakka" in the Pali literature, "Sakka" and "Śakka" in Prakrit literature, "Saka" (Bharhut) and "Śaka" in the epigraphic record.
 The Buddha is never mentioned in the Major Pillar Edicts nor in the Major Rock Edicts, and only appears once in the Bairat Temple inscription.
 The inscription was discovered by Nepalese General Kadga Shameshar, the famous Anton Führer initially was not there and arrived shortly after the discovery. The engraving is in extremely good condition and seems fresh, arguably because the portion of the pillar which contains the inscription remained underground for so long. Still, when Rhys Davids made a copy of the inscription in 1900, he noted that it was "almost as if freshly cut". Following re-examination fifty years later, academics commented: "The pillar bears an inscription of Asoka, very well preserved. The lines are straight and letters very tastefully written. It appears as if the inscription has been very recently incised."
 
These issues were popularized in 2008 by British writer Charles Allen in The Buddha and Dr. Führer: an archaeological scandal.

Lumbini was made a World Heritage Site by UNESCO in 1997.

Gallery

References

3rd-century BC inscriptions
3rd-century BC establishments in Nepal
1896 archaeological discoveries
Monuments and memorials in Nepal
Archaeological sites in Nepal
Nepalese inscriptions
Edicts of Ashoka
Archaeological discoveries in Nepal